Silverstoneia is a genus of poison dart frogs (family Dendrobatidae) from southern Central America and northern South America, between southwestern Costa Rica and southwestern Colombia. It is named in honour of Phillip A. Silverstone, an expert on dendrobatoid frogs.

Description
Silverstoneia are small frogs, with adult size < in snout–vent length. They have brown, cryptic colouration in the dorsum. They have a pale oblique lateral stripe as well as pale ventrolateral stripe, but no pale dorsolateral stripe (except for some populations of Silverstoneia flotator in Costa Rica). Dorsal skin texture is granular posteriorly.

Species
There are eight species of Silverstoneia:

References

 
Poison dart frogs
Amphibians of Central America
Amphibians of South America
Amphibian genera